The Meyrick Baronetcy, of Bush House in the parish of St Mary in the County of Pembroke and of Apley Castle in the parish of Wellington in the County of Salop, is a title in the Baronetage of the United Kingdom. It was created on 5 May 1880 for Thomas Meyrick, Conservative Member of Parliament for Pembroke from 1868 to 1874. Born Thomas Charlton, he had assumed by Royal licence the surname of Meyrick (which was that of his maternal grandfather) in lieu of his patronymic in 1858. As of 2007 the presumed fifth Baronet has not successfully proved his succession and is therefore not on the Official Roll of the Baronetage.

The family surname is pronounced "Merrick".

Meyrick baronets, of Bush House and of Apley Castle (1880)
Sir Thomas Charlton Meyrick, 1st Baronet (1837–1921)
Sir Frederick Charlton Meyrick, 2nd Baronet (1862–1932)
Sir Thomas Frederick Meyrick, 3rd Baronet (1899–1983)
Sir David John Charlton Meyrick, 4th Baronet (1926–2004)
Timothy Thomas Charlton Meyrick, presumed 5th Baronet (born 1963)

See also
 Tapps-Gervis-Meyrick baronets

Notes

References

External links
Daily Telegraph obituary of Sir David Meyrick, 4th Baronet

Meyrick